The Western Gazette is a regional newspaper, published every Thursday in Yeovil, Somerset, England. 

In 2012, Local World acquired owners Northcliffe Media from Daily Mail and General Trust. Trinity Mirror took control of Local World in late 2015 as part of a £220m deal.

In June 2016 the newspaper launched Somerset Live, a digital platform dedicated to providing news coverage, feature/human interest stories, entertainment and live blogs to readers across the South West of England and surrounding areas. 
The website received an overhaul and a redesign in May 2017 to deliver a more user friendly experience, with improved features and interaction.

The newspaper and digital operation is based at the Yeovil Innovation Centre.

The circulation is 8,036.

References

Northcliffe Media
Newspapers published in Somerset
Newspapers published in Dorset
Yeovil
Publications established in 1737